Craig Kirkwood (born August 10, 1974) is an American lawyer and former actor. He is best known for his role as Jerry "Rev" Harris in the 2000 film Remember the Titans.

Career
Kirkwood was born in Los Angeles, California. He made his acting debut in a Levi's commercial after being hired by his aunt who is a casting director, Amy Sobo. After enrolling in high-school drama classes, in 1993 he was cast in the NBC Saturday morning sitcom Running the Halls, which ran for one season. He went on to guest star on My So-Called Life, Family Matters, The Parent 'Hood, The Fresh Prince of Bel-Air, Sister, Sister, The Burning Zone, The Steve Harvey Show, Beyond Belief: Fact or Fiction, Mercy Point, Nikki, JAG, It's All Relative and Courting Alex.

In 1997, Kirkwood co-starred in the TV series Deepwater Black, which ended after one season.

Kirkwood's most notable role to date was as Jerry "Rev" Harris in the 2000 Disney film Remember the Titans. Kirkwood co-starred in Why Do Fools Fall in Love and the Disney Channel Original Movie Hounded with Tahj Mowry (Nominated for an Emmy Award for Best Supporting Actor - Comedy or Musical).  He appeared in the films Slash, Dead Above Ground, Cats and Mice, Rain and Calendar Girls. He has performed in theater for plays including Little Shop of Horrors, Grease and Big River.

Kirkwood graduated from Loyola Law School in 2008 and is now a practicing criminal defense attorney having passed the California Bar Examination.

Filmography

Film

Television

References

External links

1974 births
Living people
20th-century American male actors
21st-century American male actors
Male actors from Los Angeles
African-American male actors
African-American lawyers
American male musical theatre actors
American male film actors
American male television actors
California lawyers
Loyola Law School alumni
20th-century African-American male singers
21st-century African-American people